is a railway station in the city of Okaya, Nagano Prefecture, Japan  jointly operated by JR Central and JR East. It is managed by JR East.

Lines
Kawagishi Station is served by the old route of Chūō Main Line  (Okaya-Shiojiri branch) and is 3.5 kilometers from the branching point of the line at Okaya Station and 213.9 from the terminus at Tokyo Station. A small number of trains on the Iida Line also continue past the nominal terminus of the line at Tatsuno to stop at this station and the following Okaya Station.

Station layout
The station consists of one ground-level island platform serving two tracks, connected to the station building by a footbridge. The station is unattended.

Platforms

History
The station opened on 28 October 1923. With the privatization of Japanese National Railways (JNR) on 1 April 1987, the station came under the control of JR East.

Surrounding area
Tenryū River

See also
 List of railway stations in Japan

References

External links

 JR East station information 

Railway stations in Nagano Prefecture
Chūō Main Line
Iida Line
Railway stations in Japan opened in 1923
Stations of East Japan Railway Company
Okaya, Nagano